Anastácia Solange Sibo Dias (born 27 May 1982) is an Angolan handball player. She plays for the club Petro Atlético, and on the Angolan national team. She represented Angola at the 2013 World Women's Handball Championship in Serbia.

References

Angolan female handball players
1982 births
Living people